Gareyevka (Gäräy) is a rural locality (a village) in Kelteyevsky Selsoviet, Kaltasinsky District, Bashkortostan, Russia. The population was 15 as of 2010. There are 2 streets.

Geography 
Gareyevka is located 18 km southwest of Kaltasy (the district's administrative centre) by road. Novy Ashit is the nearest rural locality.

References 

Rural localities in Kaltasinsky District